Haiti competed at the 2016 Summer Olympics in Rio de Janeiro, Brazil, from 5 to 21 August 2016. It was the nation's sixteenth appearance at the Summer Olympics since its debut in 1900.

Haitian Olympic Committee (COH) sent the nation's largest delegation to the Games since 1976. A total of 10 athletes, 7 men and 3 women, were selected to the Haitian team across seven sports.

Eight Haitian athletes were born and raised in the United States, having acquired a dual citizenship to represent their parents' homeland at these Games. Among them were taekwondo fighter Aniya Louissaint, 19-year-old light welterweight boxer Richardson Hitchins, first female swimmer Naomy Grand'Pierre (born in Canada), female hurdler Mulern Jean, male hurdler Jeffrey Julmis, the lone returning athlete from London 2012, and freestyle wrestler Asnage Castelly, who eventually led the team as the oldest competitor (aged 38) and Haiti's flag bearer in the opening ceremony. While the American-born athletes shared their kinship ties with Haiti, freestyle swimmer Frantz Dorsainvil and weightlifter Edouard Joseph (men's 62 kg) were the nation's only homegrown Olympians on the team.

Before Rio de Janeiro, Haitian athletes yielded a tally of two Olympic medals, a silver won by long jumper Silvio Cator in 1928, and a bronze by a team of five rifle shooters in 1924. Haiti, however, did not win its first Olympic medal for nearly nine decades.

Athletics (track and field)
 
Haitian athletes achieved qualifying standards in the following athletics events (up to a maximum of 3 athletes in each event):

Track & road events

Boxing

Haiti entered one boxer to compete in the men's light welterweight division into the Olympic boxing tournament. Richardson Hitchins claimed an Olympic spot with a quarterfinal victory at the 2016 AIBA World Qualifying Tournament in Baku, Azerbaijan.

Judo

Haiti qualified one judoka for the men's lightweight category (73 kg) at the Games. Josue Deprez earned a continental quota spot from the Pan American region as the highest-ranked Haitian judoka outside of direct qualifying position in the IJF World Ranking List of May 30, 2016.

Swimming

Haiti received a Universality invitation from FINA to send two swimmers (one male and one female) to the Olympics, signifying the nation's return to the sport for the first time since 1996.

Taekwondo
 
Haiti received an invitation from the Tripartite Commission to send Aniya Louissaint in the women's welterweight category (67 kg) into the Olympic taekwondo competition, signifying the nation's Olympic comeback to the sport for the first time since 2004.

Weightlifting
 
Haiti received an invitation from the Tripartite Commission to send Edouard Joseph in the men's featherweight category (62 kg) to the Olympics, signifying the nation's Olympic return to the sport for the first time since 1960.

Wrestling
 
Haiti received an invitation from the Tripartite Commission to send a wrestler competing in the men's freestyle 74 kg to the Olympics, signifying the nation's debut in the sport.

Men's freestyle

See also
Haiti at the 2015 Pan American Games

References

External links 

 

Nations at the 2016 Summer Olympics
2016
2016 in Haitian sport